KNEL-FM 95.3 FM is a radio station licensed to Brady, Texas.  The station broadcasts a country music format and is owned by Farris Broadcasting, Inc.

References

External links
KNEL's official website

NEL-FM
Country radio stations in the United States